Shhh... Don't Tell is the fifth album by Adam Sandler, released on Warner Bros. Records in 2004. It is a collection of songs and skits that feature the voices of Sandler himself, Allen Covert, Rob Schneider, Peter Dante, Jonathan Loughran, David Spade, Blake Clark, Nick Swardson, Maya Rudolph and Molly Shannon. The album's final track, "Stan the Man", is a tribute to Sandler's father, Stanley. It was later played over the end credits of the 2010 film Grown Ups.

Track listing

Personnel 
 Adam Sandler – main performer, vocals, producer
 Rob Schneider – Mr. Karachi on "Whore! Where Are You?!"
 Allen Covert – performer, producer
 Peter Dante – performer
 David Spade – performer
 Blake Clark - performer
 Nick Swardson – performer
 Betsy Hammer – performer, vocals, backing vocals, design
 Adam & the Brooktones – backing vocals
 Jeannie Perkins – backing vocals
 Teddy Castellucci – acoustic guitar, arranger
 Waddy Wachtel – guitar
 Dave Marotta – bass guitar
 Craig Doerge – piano, keyboards
 Tom Mgrdichian – keyboards, programming
 Stuart Grusin – organ
 Don Heffington – drums, percussion
 Fred Howard – sound effects
 Brooks Arthur – producer, photography, yells, falsetto
 Janice Soled – production coordination
 Nicholaus Goossen – associate producer
 Gabe Veltri – engineer, digital editing, mixing
 Eric Mayron – tracking engineer, digital editing, mixing
 Francis "Franny G" Graham – tracking engineer, digital editing, mixing
 Bob Wayne – analog engineer
 Clayton Weber – assistant engineer
 Bernie Grundman – mastering
 Andy Brohard – engineer
 Mike Butler – digital editing
 Jay Goin – digital editing
 Ted Lobinger – digital editing, group member, sound design
 Bryan Zee – digital editing, mixing
 The Happy Madison Players: Orada Justatayanond, Ted Lobinger, Ching Lee, Nicholaus Goossen, Elmo Weber on "Pibb Takes the Mexican ATV Tour"

Charts

Weekly charts

Songs chart positions

References 

Adam Sandler albums
2004 albums
Warner Records albums
Albums produced by Brooks Arthur